Gelassenheit was a German word for tranquil submission used in the Christian mystical tradition.  It has continued in English in two distinct usages:
 in Heideggerian usage, and
 in the Anabaptist tradition.